José Manuel Mendes Gomes (born 20 June 1996) is a Portuguese professional footballer who plays for Nacional as a left back.

Club career
Born in Cabeceiras de Basto, Braga District, Gomes completed his development at local S.C. Braga. He made his professional debut for the reserve team on 24 August 2014 in a 2–1 loss at G.D. Chaves in the Segunda Liga, as a half-time substitute for Núrio Fortuna. On 5 October, he was sent off in a game of the same result at U.D. Oliveirense. He made his only first-team appearance the following 4 February in a dead rubber Taça da Liga group match, a 2–0 win away to Rio Ave F.C. as a late replacement.

In June 2017, Gomes moved to F.C. Penafiel also in the second division. He received two straight red cards in his first months at the club, both given out before half time.

Free agent Gomes left for Chaves, newly relegated from the Primeira Liga, in June 2019. Once his two-year deal had expired, he signed for three seasons at C.D. Nacional.

References

External links

Portuguese League profile 

1996 births
Living people
Portuguese footballers
Portugal youth international footballers
Association football defenders
Liga Portugal 2 players
S.C. Braga B players
S.C. Braga players
F.C. Penafiel players
G.D. Chaves players
C.D. Nacional players
Sportspeople from Braga District